5059 is an aluminium–magnesium alloy, primarily alloyed with magnesium. It is not strengthened by heat treatment, instead becoming stronger due to strain hardening, or cold mechanical working of the material.

Since heat treatment doesn't strongly affect the strength, 5059 can be readily welded and retain most of its mechanical strength.

5059 alloy was derived from closely related 5083 aluminium alloy by researchers at Corus Aluminium in 1999.

Basic properties

Chemical properties
The alloy composition of 5059 is:
 Magnesium - 5%-6% by weight
 Chromium - 0.3% maximum
 Copper - 0.4% maximum
 Iron - 0.5% maximum
 Manganese - 0.6% - 1.2%
 Silicon - 0.45% maximum
 Titanium - 4.6%
 Zinc - 0.4% - 1.5%
 Zirconium - 0.05%-0.25%
 Others each 0.05% maximum
 Others total 0.15% maximum
 Remainder Aluminium

Mechanical properties
The mechanical properties of 5059 vary significantly with hardening and temperature.

–O hardening
At cryogenic temperatures it is slightly stronger; above  its strength is reduced.

Elongation, the strain before material failure, is 24% at room temperature.

–H131 hardening
Produced by Aleris under the AluStar brand.

–H136 hardening
Produced by Aleris under the AluStar brand.

–H321 hardening

Uses
5059 has been used as a hull material for small aluminium boats or larger yachts. Its high strength and good corrosion resistance make it an excellent match for yachting.

5059 has been tested for use in vehicle armor.

5059 has been used for cryogenic propellant tanks for experimental reusable rocket vehicles.

Welding
5059 is often assembled using arc welding, typically MIG (for marine use) or TIG welding. The newer technique of Friction stir welding has also been successfully applied but is not in common use.

Arc welding reduces mechanical properties to no worse than –O hardening condition. The relatively low decrease in ultimate strength is extremely good performance for an aluminium alloy.

References

Aluminium alloy table 

Aluminium–magnesium alloys